Campoo de Enmedio is a municipality located in the autonomous community of Cantabria, Spain. According to the 2007 census, the city has a population of 3.996 inhabitants. Its capital is Matamorosa.

Celada Marlantes is a locality within the municipality.

References

External links
 Campoo de Enmedio - Cantabria 102 Municipios

Municipalities in Cantabria